The Information technology sector in Russia employed around 300,000 people in 2012, and contributed 1.2% of the country's GDP in 2015. The sector is concentrated in the cities of Moscow and Saint Petersburg.

History

The Russian IT sector drew comparatively little from Soviet-era institutions. Russian IT companies were started in the early 1990s by founders with an academic background seeking to find a place in the new market economy. Piracy was widespread in the country, with an estimated 90% of all software in Russia being pirated in 1997.

In the 1990s, companies such as Vist began assembling computers out of foreign-made components, targeting small businesses and families who could not afford foreign brands like IBM and Compaq. DVM Computer gained some traction in the laptop market with its RoverBook brand. The Russian Computer Association (Российская компьютерная ассоциация) was the trade association representing the sector. In 1997 Yandex was established in Moscow.

In 1999 MCST developed the Elbrus 2000 processor, which was initially hyped as an Itanium killer, but the project was hampered by a chronic lack of funding.

Over time, Russian companies moved to software development, an activity which enjoyed higher margins. Local companies cater to the specific needs of the Russian market, such as ERP software developed by 1C Company with a focus on Russian accounting rules. Kaspersky Labs is described as the flagship company of the Russian IT industry. Exports of software and IT services from Russia reached $7 billion in 2015, up from $2.8 billion in 2009.

In 2012 MCST launched the NT-ElbrusS, a rugged laptop for military applications.

In the aftermath of the War in Donbass and the annexation of Crimea, the Ukrainian government banned a number of Russian IT companies from conducting business in the country.

In June 2015 the Russian parliament passed a law to establish a preference system for software developed in Russia.

Worsening relations between the United States and Russia have led some to advocate a purge of Russian software.

Largest Internet companies
List of the largest internet companies based in Russia, according to the local version of Forbes:

See also
 List of Russian IT developers

References

External links
 Federal registry of Russian software

Information technology in Russia